Ciarán Kenny (born 14 August 1984 in Kilmuckridge, County Wexford, Ireland) is an Irish sportsperson.  He plays hurling with his local club Buffers Alley and has been a member of the Wexford senior inter-county team since 2006.

References

 

1984 births
Living people
Buffer's Alley hurlers
Wexford inter-county hurlers